SPIN World Cricket Monthly, also known as SPIN Magazine, was a UK-based cricket magazine, established in 2005. Duncan Steer was the editor of the magazine. The magazine was latterly edited by Kim Jones, the assistant editor being Lizzy Ammon.

The magazine had a strong focus on English county cricket but contained news, features and interviews on all cricket - domestic and International.

References

External links
SPIN Podcast

2005 establishments in the United Kingdom
Monthly magazines published in the United Kingdom
Sports magazines published in the United Kingdom
Defunct cricket magazines
Magazines established in 2005